Tanypeza picticornis is a species of fly in the family Tanypezidae.

References

Nerioidea
Diptera of North America
Insects described in 1916